Jay Creek is a stream in Worth County in the U.S. state of Missouri. It is a tributary of Marlowe Creek.

The stream flows to the south-southwest roughly paralleling the west side of U.S. Route 169.

Jay Creek has the name of one William Jay.

See also
List of rivers of Missouri

References

Rivers of Worth County, Missouri
Rivers of Missouri